The Ahimsa Award is an annual award given by the Institute of Jainology in recognition of individuals who embody and promote the principles of Ahimsa (nonviolence). It was established in 2006 and has since been awarded at the annual "Ahimsa Day" event, on 2 October, the birth anniversary of Mahatma Gandhi.

The event is normally held at the Palace of Westminster—House of Commons of the United Kingdom, in London, where various members of Parliament are invited to speak. It is bestowed by the directors of the Institute of Jainology, an international body based in the UK, representing the Jain faith.

Ahimsa Day
Ahimsa Day was established by the Institute of Jainology and has been celebrated annually in London since 2002. It was created to bring awareness of Ahimsa (nonviolence) as it applies in Jainism. The event takes place in early October to commemorate the birth anniversary of Mahatma Gandhi, who, amongst other great leaders, was inspired by the Jain philosophy of ahimsa. In 2007, the United Nations declared that the International Day of Non-Violence would take place on 2 October.

History and background
Ahimsa, (the principle of nonviolence), is a concept adopted by most Indic religious traditions, primarily Buddhist, Hindu, and Jain. The political and social application of ahimsa was given universal recognition by Mahatma Gandhi, who fought the campaign for the independence of India with the doctrine of ahimsa as the cornerstone.

Ahimsa in Jainism is a well-established core principle even before the time of Mahavira, the 24th Thirthankara in the 5th century BC. The principle of Ahimsa in Jainism states that one should do no harm by word, thought, or deed, nor ask others to, and nor condone that which is done.

Past winners
 2006 Nelson Mandela
 2007 Dalai Lama
 2008 Acharya Mahapragyaji
 2009 Padmanabh Jaini
 2010 Nalini Balbir
 2011 Nitin Mehta
 2012 Scott Neeson
 2013 Melanie Joy
 2014 Ingrid Newkirk
 2015 Charles, Prince of Wales
 2015 Ann Cotton
 2016 Rajendra Singh
 2017 Ravinder Singh
 2018 Shantilal Mutha
 2020 Peter Tabichi

References

External links
 Institute of Jainology official website
 Encyclopedia on Jainism

Jainism and society
Awards established in 2006
Nonviolence
Humanitarian and service awards